The Ford Nucleon is a concept car developed by Ford in 1957, designed as a future nuclear-powered car—one of a handful of such designs during the 1950s and 1960s. The concept was only demonstrated as a scale model. The design did not include an internal-combustion engine; rather, the vehicle was to be powered by a small nuclear reactor in the rear of the vehicle, based on the assumption that this would one day be possible by reducing sizes. The car was to use a steam engine powered by uranium fission, similar to those found in nuclear submarines. 

The mock-up of the car can be viewed at the Henry Ford Museum in Dearborn, Michigan.

Design concept

At the time of the concept's unveiling, nuclear technology was relatively new, and it was believed that nuclear fission technology could be made compact and affordable, such that nuclear fuel would become the primary energy source in the U.S., and gasoline would become obsolete. Ford envisioned a future where gas stations would be replaced with full service recharging stations, and that the vehicle would get  before the reactor would have to be exchanged for a new one. These would be scaled-down versions of the nuclear reactors that military submarines used at the time, utilizing uranium as the fissile material. Because the entire reactor would be replaced, Ford hypothesized that the owner would have multiple choices for reactors, such as a fuel-efficient model or a high-performance model, at each reactor change.  Ultimately, the reactor would use heat to convert water into steam and the power train would be steam-driven.

In popular culture
The Nucleon is the inspiration for nuclear cars in the Fallout video game franchise. For example, in-game billboards describe the fictional Chryslus Corvega Atomic V8 as having an "Atomic V8" engine. The game's depiction is purely satirical, however, as the cars explode into an implausible mushroom cloud and release radiation when shot.

See also
 Ford Seattle-ite XXI
 Studebaker Packard Astral

References

External links

Nuclear propulsion
Nucleon